Averdieck is a surname. Notable people with the surname include:

Elise Averdieck (1808–1907), German social activist, deaconess, and writer
James Averdieck (born 1965), British entrepreneur